Explorers Range is a large mountain range in the Bowers Mountains of Victoria Land, Antarctica, extending from Mount Bruce in the north to Carryer Glacier and McLin Glacier in the south. Named by the New Zealand Antarctic Place-Names Committee (NZ-APC) for the northern party of New Zealand Geological Survey Antarctic Expedition (NZGSAE), 1963–64, whose members carried out a topographical and geological survey of the area. The names of several party members are assigned to features in and about this range. All of the geographical features listed below lie situated on the Pennell Coast, a portion of Antarctica lying between Cape Williams and Cape Adare.

Key mountains
 Mount Ford is a prominent mountain (2,580 m) located 2 nautical miles (3.7 km) north of Miller Peak and 4 nautical miles (7 km) west-southwest of Mount Ashworth. Explored by the northern party of NZGSAE, 1963–64, and named for M.R.J. Ford who wintered at Scott Base and was deputy leader-surveyor of the northern party.
 Gary Peaks are two peaks which form a portion of the north wall of Sheehan Glacier, situated 4 nautical miles (7 km) west-southwest of Mount Hager. Mapped by United States Geological Survey (USGS) from surveys and U.S. Navy air photos, 1960-65. Named by Advisory Committee on Antarctic Names (US-ACAN) for Gary F. Martin, U.S. Navy, machinery repairman at the South Pole Station in 1965.
 Mount Glasgow is a mountain, 2,490 m, standing 4 nautical miles (7 km) northwest of Mount Webb. Named by NZGSAE, 1967–68, for J. Glasgow, field assistant with the expedition.
 Mount Hager is a mountain (2,420 m) located 6 miles (10 km) west of Mount Cantello. Mapped by USGS from surveys and U.S. Navy air photos, 1960-65. Named by Advisory Committee on Antarctic Names (US-ACAN) for Clarence L. Hager, geophysicist at the South Pole Station, 1967-68.
 Miller Peak is a peak (2,420 m) located 2 mi south of Mount Ford. Explored by the northern party of NZGSAE, 1963–64, and named for J.H. "Bob" (now Sir J. Holmes) Miller, leader-surveyor of that party.
 Mount Sturm is a peak, 2,320 m, standing directly at the head of Rastorguev Glacier. Named by the northern party of the NZGSAE, 1963–64, for Arnold Sturm, senior geologist with the expedition.
 Mount Webb is a mountain (2,430 m) rising 4 nautical miles (7 km) southeast of Mount Glasgow at the west side of Edlin Neve. Named by the NZGSAE, 1967–68, for William Webb, leader of the Scott Base winter party, 1968.

Features
Geographical features include:

 Alt Glacier
 Alvarez Glacier
 Arruiz Glacier
 Astakhov Glacier
 Chugunov Glacier
 Crawford Glacier
 Graveson Glacier
 Hicks Ridge
 Miller Peak
 Morley Glacier
 Mount Banks
 Mount Marwick
 Mount McCallum
 Mount Tokoroa
 Rastorguev Glacier
 Sheehan Glacier

References

Mountain ranges of Victoria Land
Pennell Coast